Battle of the Sambre may refer to:

 Battle of Sabis (57 BC), also known as the Battle of the Sambre
 Battle of the Sambre (1914), commonly known as the Battle of Charleroi, between French and German forces
 Battle of the Sambre (1918), the final British offensive of World War I